Valley is a neighborhood in northwestern Providence, Rhode Island. It is bounded to the north by Chalkstone Avenue, to the east by Raymond Street, to the south by Harris Avenue and Atwells Avenue, and to the west by Academy Avenue. The population of the neighborhood, as of 2000, was 4,765.

Geography
Valley is bisected by Valley Street. North of Valley Street are double- and triple-decker family homes. South of Valley Street are old factories and mills.

The southern part of the neighborhood includes many former factories and mills along the Woonasquatucket River, including makers of locomotive engines, automobiles, cars and trucks. These included the Providence Iron and Steel Co, Monohasset Mill, U.S. Rubber, American Locomotive Co., and others. Many of these have been converted to artist lofts and urban office complexes, such as The Steel Yard. In 2020 a distillery, the first in Providence since Prohibition, opened in the neighborhood.

Demographics
The neighborhood is 32.5% Non-Hispanic White, 5.2% Asian or Pacific Islander, 14.6% African-American, and 42.4% Hispanic. The median household income is $25,077, and the median family income is $25,339. 26.4% of families live below the poverty line.

References

Neighborhoods in Providence, Rhode Island